The Liverpool Pullman was a British Pullman train operated by the London Midland Region of British Railways. It was introduced in 1966 upon the electrification of the West Coast Main Line.

The Liverpool Pullman made the end-to-end London-Liverpool journey in a record 2 hours 35 minutes. Unlike many British Pullman services (including its sister train of the same era, the Manchester Pullman), it was not all-Pullman but also conveyed second-class coaches. Its typical formation was four 2nd-class coaches and four first-class Pullman cars (two 36-seat parlour cars, one 18-seat kitchen car and one 30-seat parlour brake), hauled by a Class 86 electric locomotive.

Upon introduction on 18 April 1966 the timetable was:

In 1968 the down (northbound) Liverpool Pullman was scheduled to cover the 163 miles from Watford Junction to Runcorn in 119 minutes, for an average speed of 82.3 mph, then the fastest-ever start-to-stop regular timing in Britain.

The Liverpool Pullman was not as successful as its Manchester counterpart, and in the 1970s it was downgraded to an ordinary unnamed train at a time when the Pullman concept had gone out of fashion.

See also
 List of named passenger trains of the United Kingdom

Notes

Named passenger trains of British Rail
Railway services introduced in 1966
Pullman Car Company (UK)
Rail transport in Liverpool
Historic transport in Merseyside